Donald Julius Stohr (March 9, 1934 – December 10, 2015) was a United States district judge of the United States District Court for the Eastern District of Missouri.

Education and career

Born in Sedalia, Missouri, Stohr received a Bachelor of Science degree from Saint Louis University in 1956 and a Juris Doctor from Saint Louis University School of Law in 1958. He was in private practice in St. Louis, Missouri from 1958 to 1962. At age 26 in 1960, he was the Republican candidate for Missouri attorney general, eventually losing to Democract candidate Thomas F. Eagleton, eventual Democrat nominee for Vice President running with George McGovern. Stohr and Eagleton would drive to the debates together and became friends and later law partners. He was a first assistant county counselor, St. Louis County, Missouri from 1963 to 1965. He was a St. Louis County counselor from 1965 to 1966. He was in private practice in St. Louis from 1966 to 1973. He was the United States Attorney for the Eastern District of Missouri from 1973 to 1976. He was in private practice in St. Louis from 1976 to 1992.

Federal judicial service

Stohr was nominated by President George H. W. Bush on November 14, 1991, to the United States District Court for the Eastern District of Missouri, to a new seat created by 104 Stat. 5089. He was confirmed by the United States Senate on April 8, 1992, and received his commission on April 13, 1992. He assumed senior status on December 31, 2006, serving in that status until his death on December 10, 2015, in Ladue, Missouri.

References

External links
FJC Bio

1934 births
2015 deaths
People from Sedalia, Missouri
Judges of the United States District Court for the Eastern District of Missouri
Saint Louis University alumni
Saint Louis University School of Law alumni
United States district court judges appointed by George H. W. Bush
20th-century American judges
United States Attorneys for the Eastern District of Missouri